Ankare (lit. Anchors) is the seventh novel by Swedish author Klas Östergren. It was published in 1988.

References

External links

1988 Swedish novels
Novels by Klas Östergren
Swedish-language novels
Novels set in Scania
Albert Bonniers Förlag books